John Cooper (born 1938 in Derby) is an English retired garage proprietor who was a prolific short-circuit motorcycle road racer during the 1960s and early 1970s. He also entered selected Grands Prix motorcycle road races. His best season was in 1967 when he finished the year in seventh place in the 500cc world championship. Cooper was a two-time winner of the North West 200 race held in Northern Ireland. He is remembered for his upset victory over the reigning 500cc world champion, Giacomo Agostini at the 1971 Race of the Year held at Mallory Park. Cooper rode a BSA Rocket 3 to finish three-fifths of a second ahead of Agostini's MV Agusta, achieving his fifth victory in the race since 1965.

Racing career
John 'Mooneyes' Cooper had the given name of John Herbert Cooper. He started motorcycle sport local to Derbyshire by riding a rigid-framed 197cc James entering off-road trials in 1954 at age 16. He progressed to a plunger-sprung James track race bike tuned by Harry Lomas (father of racer Bill Lomas) entering informal events organised by his local Derby club at Osmaston Manor. For 1958 Cooper had a different James powered by a tuned Triumph Tiger Cub engine, which he raced against Percy Tait who also had a Cub.

Cooper had a long-standing association with motorcycle dealer Wraggs. By 1960 he was riding their BSA Gold Star for the 500cc class and later a 350cc Gold Star engined Norton.

1961 saw Wraggs providing him with 1960 350 and 500 Manx Nortons which he later purchased in 1964, selling them on in 1966. A trained mechanic, he preferred to work on his own bikes, excepting the engine preparation which was by respected tuner Francis Beart.

Cooper first entered the TT races in 1964, scoring ninth-place in the Senior 500cc race, failing to finish in the other classes and again in the 1965 races when riding a 250cc Greeves with 350 and 500 Nortons.

Cooper was famously known as 'Mooneyes'. He initially decorated his helmet with the initials 'J C' followed by a hand-drawn cartoon character "Jiminy Cricket", continuing the 'J C' theme. His helmet was rejected by race officials, so he painted a new helmet red but found it plain. Adding two stick-on giant 'eyes', a motoring gimmick of the 1960s, endured as his personal design throughout his career.

Cooper's experience and successes continued throughout the 1960s becoming a rival to Derek Minter who retired from racing in 1967. Minter was known by his race successes as 'King of Brands', and Cooper as 'Master of Mallory'. A section of the Mallory Park, Leicestershire circuit has been renamed from Lake Esses to the John Cooper Esses in his honor.

Cooper rode a variety of machinery during his race career, including a Kawasaki 250 cc twin in the 1967 Lightweight TT, Norton twins, Seeley AJS 350 cc and Seeley Matchless 500 cc, 250 cc and 350 cc Yamsels – Yamaha two-stroke engines fitted into Seeley frames, and in the 1970 Production 750 cc TT race on a works Honda CB750, finishing in ninth place, before being associated with the works BSA Rocket 3.

Personal life
Cooper was a trained mechanic and after National Service in 1958 he worked as a manager for his father's gents' outfitters in Derby.

Establishing his own garage in 1965 and later car sales, he retired from the businesses between 2007 and 2011.

After this time, there are two separate businesses associated with his name, one being a car and motorcycle garage in the old premises at Chandos Pole Street, Derby, and the other a motorcycle tyre retailer in a nearby unit.

References

External links
 John Cooper career profile at motopaedia.com

1938 births
Sportspeople from Derby
British motorcycle racers
English motorcycle racers
350cc World Championship riders
500cc World Championship riders
Isle of Man TT riders
Living people